Virgin in Glory with Saints is a 1510-1515 oil on panel painting by Giovanni Bellini and probably also his studio, now in the Gallerie dell'Accademia in Venice. It measures 3.5 m by 2.25 m and shows the Assumption of Mary, which is usually shown witnessed by the apostles - here it is instead seen by (from left to right) saint Mark, John the Evangelist, saint Luke, Francis of Assisi with the stigmata, Louis of Toulouse as a young bishop, Anthony the Great, Augustine of Hippo and John the Baptist.

It has similarities to Lorenzo Lotto's slightly earlier Asolo Altarpiece, showing the elderly Bellini still learning from younger artists. It was originally produced for the Santa Maria degli Angeli in Murano and was later transferred to the nearby San Pietro Martire and finally to its present home.

References

Paintings by Giovanni Bellini
1515 paintings
Paintings in the Gallerie dell'Accademia
Paintings of the Virgin Mary
Paintings of Francis of Assisi
Paintings of Anthony the Great
Paintings of Augustine of Hippo
Paintings depicting John the Baptist
Paintings of Louis of Toulouse